Samarium fluoride may refer to:

 Samarium(III) fluoride (samarium trifluoride), SmF3
 Samarium(II) fluoride (samarium difluoride), SmF2